Margriet Bleijerveld (born 16 April 1958)  is a retired Dutch field hockey player, who won a gold medal and a silver medal at the 1978 and 1981 World Cups, respectively. From 1978 to 1982, she played 41 international matches, in which she scored six goals.

References

External links

 
Margriet Bleijerveld in KNHB 

1958 births
Living people
Dutch female field hockey players
Place of birth missing (living people)
20th-century Dutch women
20th-century Dutch people
21st-century Dutch women